The Rocky Mountain Dinosaur Resource Center is a fossil museum primarily exhibiting fossil organisms of North America's Late Cretaceous including dinosaurs, pterosaurs, marine reptiles, and fish. The museum includes a fossil preparation lab and a large gift shop. Live tours are delivered by visitor experience guides highlighting the history of the individual specimens as well as the paleontology of the fossil species they represent. The RMDRC is headquarters to its parent company, Triebold Paleontology Incorporated.

History

The Dinosaur Resource Center was created to be an intentionally temporary fossil repository, displaying fossil specimens collected and cast by Triebold Paleontology Incorporated. The museum was opened to the public in May, 2004, exhibiting original and replica specimens including dinosaurs, pterosaurs and an extensive collection of Late Cretaceous marine fossil organisms primarily from the shale and chalk beds of Western Kansas. Since its opening, the Dinosaur Resource Center has exhibited a number of important original fossil specimens on their way to academic institutions including the holotype specimens of Anzu wyliei, Mercuriceratops gemini and other yet-to-be-named fossil species.

Exhibits
The museum has two main fossil exhibit halls, one featuring primarily terrestrial fossil species including dinosaurs, pterosaurs and fossil mammals, and the other featuring fossil marine organisms such as fish, mosasaurs and plesiosaurs. Many original fossil specimens are displayed as tactile exhibits available for guests to touch. A hands-on children's corner includes a touchscreen featuring 3D digital models and other hands-on activities like fossil dig stations and puzzles.

Location
The Dinosaur Resource Center is located on the south side of U.S. Highway 24 (Colorado) at Fairview Street in Woodland Park, Colorado.

Gallery

References

External links
Official website
Curators blog
Preparation lab vlog
Parent company website

Dinosaur museums in the United States
Museums in Teller County, Colorado
Natural history museums in Colorado
Articles containing video clips
Paleontology in Colorado
Museums established in 2004
2004 establishments in Colorado